Carminucci is an Italian surname. Notable people with the surname include:

Giovanni Carminucci (1939–2007), Italian gymnast
Pasquale Carminucci (1937–2015), Italian gymnast, brother of Giovanni

Italian-language surnames